PP-237 Bahawalnagar-I is a Constituency of Provincial Assembly of Punjab.

General elections 2013

General elections 2008

See also
 PP-236 Vehari-VIII
 PP-238 Bahawalnagar-II

References

External links
 Election commission Pakistan's official website
 Awazoday.com check result
 Official Website of Government of Punjab

Provincial constituencies of Punjab, Pakistan